21st Century Fox is a former media conglomerate.

21st Century Fox may also refer to:

21st Century Fox (album), an album by Samantha Fox
21st Century Fox (wrestler), ring name of Melissa Maughn, Canadian professional wrestler

See also
20th Century Studios, an American film studio owned by The Walt Disney Company
 20th Century Fox (disambiguation)